Daniel Krewski is an Academic who is Professor of Medicine and Professor of Epidemiology and Community Medicine at the University of Ottawa, where his focus is health risk assessment in the Institute of Population Health.

References

Year of birth missing (living people)
Living people
University of Ottawa alumni
Carleton University alumni
Fellows of the American Statistical Association